Daniel Iuga (born November 13, 1945) is a retired Romanian-American pistol shooter and coach. He competed for Romania in the mixed free pistol 50 m event at the 1972, 1976 and 1980 Olympics and won a silver medal in 1972.

As a teenager Iuga played football and was a keen skier and kayaker, placing second in the 500 m kayak singles at the 1961 National Junior Championships. He took up sport shooting only in 1964. The same year he won a national junior title, and in 1971 set his first national record. At the 1974 World Championships he won an individual gold and a team bronze medal. He retired from competitions after the 1980 Olympics and was appointed as a national pistol shooting coach. In 1981 he defected to West Germany while giving an invited lecture there, and for 1.5 years worked as a consultant at a gun factory in Ulm. In 1983 he immigrated to the United States, with his wife Nina and daughters Laura (born c. 1975) and Ileana (born c. 1976) joining him there in April 1985. In the U.S. Iuga coached the national pistol shooting team starting in late 1983 and resigning in April 1992. In this capacity he attended the 1984 and 1988 Olympics and 1991 Pan American Games. In 1993 he went out of retirement and in 1995 won a U.S. national title. The same year he won two individual medals at the Pan American Games. He retired for good in 1999.

References

External links 

 
 
 

1945 births
Living people
People from Târgu Ocna
Romanian male sport shooters
American male sport shooters
ISSF pistol shooters
Olympic shooters of Romania
Shooters at the 1972 Summer Olympics
Shooters at the 1976 Summer Olympics
Shooters at the 1980 Summer Olympics
Olympic silver medalists for Romania
Olympic medalists in shooting
Medalists at the 1972 Summer Olympics
Shooters at the 1995 Pan American Games
Pan American Games gold medalists for the United States
Pan American Games silver medalists for the United States
Romanian defectors
Pan American Games medalists in shooting
Medalists at the 1995 Pan American Games